Jinnah Stadium may refer to:
Jinnah Sports Stadium, Islamabad, Pakistan
Jinnah Stadium, Gujranwala, in Gujranwala, Punjab, Pakistan
Jinnah Stadium, Sialkot, in Sialkot, Pakistan, formerly named Connelly Park